Steffi Graf defeated Martina Navratilova in the final, 6–4, 7–5, 2–6, 6–2 to win the singles tennis title at the 1989 Virginia Slims Championships. It was her second Tour Finals singles title.

Gabriela Sabatini was the defending champion, but lost in the semifinals to Graf.

Seeds
A champion seed is indicated in bold text while text in italics indicates the round in which that seed was eliminated.

  Steffi Graf (champion)
  Martina Navratilova (final)
  Gabriela Sabatini (semifinals)
  Arantxa Sánchez Vicario (semifinals)
  Zina Garrison (quarterfinals)
  Monica Seles (quarterfinals)
  Helena Suková (quarterfinals)
  Manuela Maleeva-Fragnière (quarterfinals)

Draw

 NB: The Final was the best of 5 sets while all other rounds were the best of 3 sets.

See also
WTA Tour Championships appearances

References
 1989 Virginia Slims Championships Draw

Singles 1989
Singles